Lake Havasu State Park is a state park located on Lake Havasu in Mohave County, Arizona, US.  The park provides outdoor recreation opportunities such as camping, boating, and fishing.  The Arroyo-Camino Interpretive Garden displays local desert flora.

References

External links
 Lake Havasu State Park

1965 establishments in Arizona
Lake Havasu
Parks in Mohave County, Arizona
Protected areas established in 1965
Protected areas on the Colorado River
State parks of Arizona